The Public is the people and society of a nation or community, or the whole of humanity.

The Public may also refer to:

 The Public (film), a 2018 film written and directed by Emilio Estevez
 The Public (play), a 1930 play by Federico García Lorca, known in the original Spanish as El público
 The Public (journal), a news journal published 1898—1919
 The Public (newspaper), alternative newsweekly in Buffalo, New York.
 The Public Theater, a theatre company in New York City
 The Public, West Bromwich, an English community arts project based in West Bromwich

See also
 Public (album), a 1998 album by Emm Gryne
 The Phantom Public, a 1925 book by Walter Lippmann